Kerr Cuhulain is the pen name of Canadian Wiccan and retired Detective Constable Charles Ennis. A former child abuse investigator, he is the author of several articles on child abuse investigation that appeared in Law & Order Magazine. A former Air Force officer, Cuhulain was a police officer for over 28 years, a police dispatcher for another 8 years, and a Wiccan for over forty. He's served on the SWAT team, Gang Crime Unit, and hostage negotiation team.

Better known to the Pagan community by his Wiccan name, Kerr Cuhulain, Ennis was the first Wiccan police officer to go public about his beliefs. He is the former Preceptor General of Officers of Avalon, a non-profit benevolent association for Pagan and Wiccan law enforcement, firefighting and emergency medical personnel and their families. He is a frequent contributor to The Witches' Voice networking website, and has applied his abilities as an investigative journalist to the histories of several controversial individuals in the Neo-Pagan and New Age communities, such as John Todd and Michael Warnke. He speaks at writers' conferences and Pagan festivals throughout Canada and the United States.

Cuhulain lives in Sechelt, British Columbia. He founded an order of knighthood known as the Order of Paladins. He now also writes fantasy fiction as C. A. Ennis and paranormal romance as Carrie Bryce.

Bibliography
 Law Enforcement Guide to Wicca (1997) Horned Owl Publishing , 
 Wiccan Warrior (2000) Llewellyn Publications , 
 Full Contact Magick (2002) Llewellyn Publications , 
 Witch Hunts: Out of The Broom Closet (2014) Dark Moon Press, Inc. 
 Magickal Self Defense (2008) Llewellyn Publications , 
 How to be Glorious (2011) CreateSpace Publishing, 9781466382886
 Modern Knighthood (2nd edition 2013), CreateSpace Publishing, 9781463573881

References

External links
Officers of Avalon
Order of Paladins

Living people
Writers from British Columbia
Canadian occult writers
Canadian Wiccans
Year of birth missing (living people)
Wiccan writers